Novokhokhlovskaya is a station on the Moscow Central Circle.

Gallery

External links 
 mkzd.ru

Moscow Metro stations
Railway stations in Russia opened in 2016
Moscow Central Circle stations